Qarah Khan Beyglu (also Romanized as Qarah Khān Beyglū and Qareh Khān Beyglū) is a village in Darrehrud-e Jonubi Rural District of Darrehrud District of Ungut County, Ardabil province, Iran. Prior to the formation of the county, the village and rural district were in Angut District of Germi County. At the 2006 census, its population was 990 in 192 households. The following census in 2011 counted 1,149 people in 317 households. The latest census in 2016 showed a population of 922 people in 267 households; it is the center of its rural district.

References 

Populated places in Ardabil Province